Harmony is a small unincorporated community  in Albany County, Wyoming, United States, located approximately  southwest of Laramie. Harmony Elementary School is a part of Albany County School District #1. Older students attend school in Laramie.

References

Unincorporated communities in Albany County, Wyoming
Unincorporated communities in Wyoming